Murray-Darling is a former electoral district of the Legislative Assembly in the Australian state of New South Wales.

It included Urana Shire, Jerilderie Shire, Berrigan Shire, Murray Shire, Conargo Shire, Deniliquin Council, Wakool Shire, Hay Shire, Balranald Shire, Wentworth Shire, part of Carrathool Shire (including Goolgowi and Merriwagga), Central Darling Shire, the City of Broken Hill and the Unincorporated Far West.

History

Murray-Darling was created in 1999 from a merger of the Electoral district of Broken Hill and part of the Electoral district of Murray. In 2015, the southern parts of the electorate were absorbed into the new Electoral district of Murray and the northern parts (the City of Broken Hill, the Central Darling Shire and the Unincorporated Far West were absorbed into the Electoral district of Barwon.

Members for Murray-Darling

Election results

References

External links

Former electoral districts of New South Wales
1999 establishments in Australia
Constituencies established in 1999
2015 disestablishments in Australia
Constituencies disestablished in 2015